Mayar Sherif and Panna Udvardy won the title, defeating Yana Sizikova and Alison Van Uytvanck in the final, 5–7, 6–4, [10–2].

Irina Bara and Ekaterine Gorgodze were the defending champions, but chose not to participate.

Seeds

Draw

Draw

References

External links
Main Draw

2022 WTA 125 tournaments